CPAP is continuous positive airway pressure, a form of positive airway pressure ventilator.

CPAP may also refer to:

 Centrosomal P4.1-associated protein, a protein
 Coalition for the Prevention of Alcohol Problems, a public advocacy group based in Washington, D.C.
 Consecutive primes in arithmetic progression, a mathematical term relating to prime number series
 C/PAP, a code for paper and cardboard/plastic/aluminum composite in recycling code #84